Law for Tombstone is a 1937 American Western film directed by Buck Jones and W.B. Eason and written by Frances Guihan. The film stars Buck Jones, Muriel Evans, Harvey Clark, Carl Stockdale, Earle Hodgins and Alexander Cross. The film was released on October 10, 1937, by Universal Pictures.

Plot

Cast       
Buck Jones as Alamo Bowie
Muriel Evans as Nellie Gray
Harvey Clark as Doc Holliday
Carl Stockdale as Judge Hart
Earle Hodgins as Jack Dunn
Alexander Cross as Bull Clanton
Chuck Morrison as Henchman Smith
Mary Carney as Marie Bowdray 
Charles Le Moyne as Sheriff Blane
Ben Corbett as Henchman Slim
Harold Hodge as Tom Scudder
Arthur Van Slyke as Pop 
Ezra Paulette as Ranger Bob 
Francis Walker as Lee 
Silver as Silver

References

External links
 

1937 films
American Western (genre) films
1937 Western (genre) films
Universal Pictures films
American black-and-white films
Cultural depictions of Doc Holliday
1930s English-language films
1930s American films